Dolichopeza albipes is a species of fly in the family Tipulidae. It is found in the  Palearctic.

References

External links
Images representing Dolichopeza albipes at BOLD

Tipulidae
Insects described in 1768
Nematoceran flies of Europe
Taxa named by Hans Strøm